Mike "Whopper" Lenarduzzi (born September 14, 1972) is a Canadian retired ice hockey goaltender. He played four games in the National Hockey League with the Hartford Whalers during the 1992–93 and 1993–94 seasons. The rest of his career, which lasted from 1992 to 2000, was spent in various minor leagues.

Playing career
Born in London, Ontario, Lenarduzzi played junior hockey for the Oshawa Generals, Sault Ste. Marie Greyhounds, Ottawa 67s and Sudbury Wolves of the Ontario Hockey League before turning professional in 1992 with the Springfield Indians, the American Hockey League (AHL) affiliate of the Hartford Whalers. He had been drafted in the third round of the 1990 NHL Entry Draft by the Hartford Whalers. He would be in the Hartford system until 1994 - his most notable action with the system being his first regular season game for Springfield, in which he allowed eight goals on the first eleven shots he faced before being pulled - and played four games in the NHL. After 1994, he played for a number of minor league teams including the AHL Hershey Bears in 1996–97. He played one season in the Italian Hockey League for Milan in 1998–99, before finishing his career with one season with the Baton Rouge Kingfish of the ECHL in 1999–00.

Career statistics

Regular season and playoffs

External links
 

1972 births
Living people
Canadian expatriate ice hockey players in the United States
Canadian people of Italian descent
Amarillo Rattlers players
Baton Rouge Kingfish players
Canadian ice hockey goaltenders
Hartford Whalers draft picks
Hartford Whalers players
Ice hockey people from Ontario
Hershey Bears players
Mobile Mysticks players
Ottawa 67's players
Oshawa Generals players
Saginaw Wheels players
Salt Lake Golden Eagles (IHL) players
Sault Ste. Marie Greyhounds players
Sportspeople from London, Ontario
Springfield Indians players
Sudbury Wolves players